Old Crescent is a senior rugby club in Limerick, playing in Division 2A of the All-Ireland League.

History

Early years 
Old Crescent grew out of the Crescent College Munster School's cup team of 1947. Fr Gerry Guinane, who trained rugby in the College, saw great potential in that winning team and persuaded them to stay and play together. In September 1947 it became a member club of the Munster Branch of the Irish Rugby Football Union. In 1952 the club was promoted to senior club membership of the Branch and the ‘Ginner’s’ formidable negotiating skills were more than useful in the process. Father Guinane remained deeply involved with the club until his death. 

Membership was initially confined to past pupils of Crescent College SJ, however it has been an 'open club' for many years. Contact is closely maintained with the school, and pupils and past pupils are encouraged to play with the club.
 
Father Guinane’s belief in the original team was justified as in 1950/51 it reached the Munster Junior Cup final losing out to Cork Constitution five points to three and in 1954/55 again won through to the Munster Senior Cup final losing out in the end to UCC. Over the years progress on the field was mixed. In 1961/62 under the captaincy of Billy Leahy the club again reached the Munster Senior Cup Final only to lose to Bohemians. In 1976 the club won its first senior trophy, the Limerick Charity Cup.

1990s–present
In 1991/92 Old Crescent won the Munster Senior League and went on to defeat the winners of the Leinster, Connacht, and Ulster Senior Leagues, Clontarf, Galwegians, and NIFC respectively. Old Crescent, Clontarf and Galwegians won promotion to the All Ireland League. Malone, CYMS and Sundays Well lost their places. In 1995 / 96 under the captaincy of Diarmuid Reddan and the coaching team of Larry Greene, Jed O'Dwyer and John Hogan, the club won the Division 2 title going undefeated in the league campaign and achieved promotion to Division 1. 

The team held their position in Division 1 for 2 years, then regained their place for a season in 1999 / 2000. Since then the team has been a constant challenger for promotion many times coming within a game of this. At junior level, the 3rd XV captained by Mike O'Mara and managed by Eugene O'Riordan captured National honours by winning the Junior 2 Millennium Cup in 2001 / 2002.

Honours 
Munster Senior League (2) 1992 and 1997
Shared (2) 1999 (Sunday's Well) and 2000 (Young Munster)

Notable players
 Andrew Brace — played for the Belgium national team; professional referee affiliated with the IRFU.
 Eoin Reddan - played for Ireland

References

External links
Official website
Crescent College SJ website

Irish rugby union teams
Rugby union clubs in County Limerick
Rugby union clubs in Limerick (city)
Rugby clubs established in 1947
Senior Irish rugby clubs (Munster)
1947 establishments in Ireland